Mordellistena alternizona is a species of beetle in the genus Mordellistena of the family Mordellidae. It was discovered in 1929.

References

alternizona
Beetles described in 1929